Inge Jansen (born 2 June 1994) is a Dutch diver. She competed in the women's 3 metre springboard event at the 2019 World Aquatics Championships.

References

External links
 

1994 births
Living people
Dutch female divers
Place of birth missing (living people)
Divers at the 2020 Summer Olympics
Olympic divers of the Netherlands
20th-century Dutch women
21st-century Dutch women